Waterford Township is a charter township in the geographic center of Oakland County, Michigan, United States.

In 2020, the population of Waterford Township was 70,565.

Communities
Waterford Township has five unincorporated communities:

 Clintonville is located on Walton Boulevard between Clintonville Road and Sashabaw Road. 
 Drayton Plains is located at Dixie Highway on the west end of Loon Lake. 
 Elizabeth Lake is an historic resort community located on Elizabeth Lake.
 Four Towns is located at Lochaven Road and Cooley Lake Road.
 Waterford Village is an historic village located at Dixie Highway and Andersonville Road.

History
Lewis Cass, the third governor of Michigan Territory, established the boundaries of Oakland County in 1819. Waterford Township was organized in 1834.

In 1818, Oliver Williams selected land in Oakland County which he purchased for two dollars an acre. Archibald Phillips and Alpheus Williams purchased  in what later became Waterford Village.

In 1818, Oliver Williams and his family established the first farm settlement in the county on the banks of Silver Lake.

In 1819, Alpheus Williams and Archibald Phillips continued on to where the Clinton River crossed the old Saginaw Trail (now known as Dixie Highway). They settled at the site of the present Waterford Village. Here the first house of Waterford Village was built by Alpheus Williams on the north bank of the river. Archibald Phillips built his home across from the south corner where Andersonville Road meets Dixie Highway.

Williams and Phillips also built the first dam where the Clinton River crossed the Saginaw Trail and erected the first sawmill.

The township was named Waterford because of the vast number of lakes covering the township.

Geography

Climate
Like the rest of Southeast Michigan, Waterford Township has a continental climate. It has a higher elevation than Detroit ( compared to ), and therefore the township is somewhat cooler than Detroit and other nearby cities. It is moderately cold in the winter with varied snowfall throughout. Spring varies from warm by day to cool at night. The township's warmest weather occurs in the summer with temperatures in the eighty to ninety degree range and typically high humidity. Summer is also the wettest season in the area. In recent years, Waterford Township has seen a few 100-plus degree days. Fall starts warm, but November ends with high temperatures barely above freezing.

Lakes

Waterford Township is home to 34 named lakes.

Demographics
According to the 2020 U.S. Census, Waterford Township had a population of 70,565.

2020 Census
According to the 2020 U.S. Census, the racial makeup of the township was:
 85.2% White alone
 5.7% Black or African American alone
 0.5% American Indian and Alaska native alone
 2.1% Asian alone
 0.1% Native Hawaiian or Pacific Islander alone
 4.9% Two or More Races alone
 7.0% Hispanic or Latino
 81.4% White alone, not Hispanic or Latino

2010 Census
According to the 2010 Census the racial and ethnic makeup of Waterford's population was 83.7% non-Hispanic White, and 4.8% African-American, 0.4% Native American, 1.9% Asian and 6.6% Hispanic.

2000 Census
According to the 2000 U.S. Census, there were 73,150 people, 29,387 households, and 19,130 families residing in the township in 2000.

The racial makeup of the township in 2000 was:
 92.65% White
 3.91% Hispanic or Latino
 2.89% African American
 0.35% Native American
 1.27% Asian
 0.01% Pacific Islander
 1.13% from other races
 1.69% from two or more races

In 2000, there were:
 29,387 households
 30.4% of the households had children under the age of 18 living with them
 51.6% were married couples living together
 9.6% had a female householder with no husband present
 34.9% were non-families
 27.9% of all households were made up of individuals
 8.1% had someone living alone who was 65 years of age or older
 2.42 was the average household size
 2.99 was the average family size.

The township's 2000 population was:
 23.2% under the age of 18
 8.2% from 18 to 24
 36.0% from 25 to 44
 21.8% from 45 to 64
 10.8% who were 65 years of age or older
 The median age was 36 years
 For every 100 females, there were 99.6 males
 For every 100 females age 18 and over there were 97.5 males

The median income for a household in 2000 in the township was $55,008, and the median income for a family was $64,500. Males had a median income of $47,409 versus $32,016 for females. The per capita income for the township was $27,432. About 3.8% of families and 5.1% of the population were below the poverty line, including 5.8% of those under age 18 and 4.0% of those age 65 and over.

Transportation
Oakland County International Airport is located in Waterford Township. The airport is a hub for the airline Lakeshore Express, a local commuter airline to Pellston, and Chicago-Midway

Railroad
In 1851, the Detroit, Grand Haven and Milwaukee Railway came through Waterford Township and three train depots were built in Waterford Township; the Drayton Plains depot (at Hatchery Rd.), the Waterford depot (at Airport Rd.) and the Windiate depot (at Windiate Rd.) . The railroad helped make the many lakes of the Waterford area easily accessible to summer vacationers from the big cities and served to make Waterford Township a summer resort area.
In 1882, the Detroit, Grand Haven and Milwaukee Railway was purchased by the Grand Trunk Western Railroad.

As roads were improved, people began driving to their summer resort area and the passenger depots were closed in the late 1950s.

The Windiate Park Hotel was a summer resort for vacationers from Detroit and
Lansing. The resort was easily accessed by four trains a day during the summer months from the 1890s to the 1940s and was located on Lotus Lake, near the Windiate depot. The resort featured boating, fishing, sailing, sunbathing, tennis and a dance hall. The resort was owned by J.D. and M.L. Rice.

Another popular summer resort was the Waterford Hotel in the village of Waterford. The hotel was sold to William Bradt, who changed its name to Bradt's Exchange. The hotel was also named the Waterford Exchange, and served as a stagecoach stop for over 60 years.

Today, the railroad is owned by Canadian National Railway (CN) and passenger service is no longer offered, giving way to freight only.

There are seven railroad crossings in Waterford Township and one railroad bridge.

Government and infrastructure
The West Campus of the Oakland County Service Center is located in Waterford Township. This includes the Oakland County Executive Building and Conference Center, and the Oakland County Children's Village, the county's juvenile detention center for children. The Children's Village acts as one of the support sites for the Waterford School District.

Education

Public schools
The Waterford School District operates public schools in most of Waterford Township (the Pontiac School District serves a small portion of the township).

In 1961, Kettering High School opened and Mott High School opened in 1969. Kettering's address is now 2800 Kettering Drive in Waterford. In 2012, Durant High School, an alternative school, opened in the township at 501 N. Cass Lake Road in Waterford. All three Waterford Township public high schools were named after automobile industry pioneers; William C. Durant, Charles F. Kettering, and Charles S. Mott. Waterford Township High School was located in Waterford Township, Michigan at the corner of Highland Rd. and Crescent Lake Rd. It was closed as a high school in 1983, but the Board of Education continued to use the building for several years for various purposes. (Waterford Township: Year Opened: 1947, Year Closed: 1983).

In 1957, John D. Pierce Junior High School opened at 5145 Hatchery Road in Waterford, and Stevens T. Mason Junior High School was opened in 1965 at 3835 West Walton Blvd. in Waterford. Both junior high schools originally included grades 7 through 9. Today, both Pierce and Mason are middle schools, which include grades 6 through 8.

As of the 2015–16 school year, the Waterford School District has nine public elementary schools located within the township; William Beaumont Elementary School, Thomas M. Cooley Elementary School, Donelson Hills Elementary School, David Grayson Elementary School, Laura S. Haviland Elementary School, Douglass Houghton Elementary School, William S. Knudsen Elementary School, Riverside Elementary School, and Henry R. Schoolcraft Elementary School.

Private schools
Opened in 1960, Our Lady of the Lakes School is a private Catholic K-12 school also located in the township at 5495 Dixie Highway, just south of Waterford Village.

St. Benedict School in Waterford was in operation until circa 2003, when the campus became the lower (elementary school) of Notre Dame Preparatory School and Marist Academy; this occurred in a time when other Catholic elementary schools in the area closed. The lower school moved to the common Pontiac campus in 2013.

Community College
Waterford Township is home to the Oakland Community College Highland Lakes Campus. The campus, which opened in 1965, is located at 7350 Cooley Lake Road in Waterford.

Oakland Schools, the intermediate school district serving Oakland County, has its offices in Waterford Township.

Public library
The Waterford Township Public Library serves the residents of the township. It is located at 5168 Civic Center Drive, off of Crescent Lake Road near Hatchery Road in Waterford.

Public safety
Waterford Township maintains its own police and fire departments.

The Waterford Police Department was founded in 1953. Frank VanAtta was appointed the first Waterford Chief of Police, earning a yearly salary of $5,500. William Stokes was a long time chief who had some 30 years of service before retiring in 1985. He was followed by Robert (Duke) Reynolds and then Gary Root followed by Paul Valad. After a short and contentious stint as chief (a vote of no confidence showed zero votes for), Daniel McCaw was replaced by the current chief Scott Underwood who retired as a Lieutenant at the Warren Police Department.

The police station is located at 5150 Civic Center Drive in 
Waterford near the Waterford Township Hall and the 51st District Court in the Waterford Civic Center Complex. The police department was drastically cut in 2010 due to the falling economy and the closing of 2 of the largest commercial tax sources- The Summit Place Mall and a General Motors facility. The department went from over 100 sworn police officers to 55 which was similar to the number of officers in the 1970s. A recent tax increase voted on by the residents is supposed to add 9 more officers. Waterford still remains one of the largest physical and populated areas in Oakland County but remains on the bottom of police officers per population. The department has a current force of roughly 25 patrol officers for the population of over 70,000 residents. The Waterford Regional Fire Department employs 144. It is currently the 4th largest Fire Department in the State of Michigan. Waterford Township also provides Fire, EMS, and Dispatch services to the neighboring City of Pontiac and City of Lake Angelus.

Notable people
Todd Alsup, pianist, singer-songwriter
Mary Barra, CEO, General Motors
Paul Fry, baseball player for the Baltimore Orioles
Pat LaFontaine, former NHL player, 2003 Hockey Hall of Fame inductee 
Kirk Gibson, former MLB player
Gail Goestenkors, former women's basketball head coach, University of Texas
Michael L. Good, dean, University of Florida College of Medicine
Dylan Larkin, NHL player and captain of the Detroit Red Wings 
Dave Marsh, music critic
Jim Miller, former NFL player
Paul Mitchell, Member of the United States House of Representatives
Kristopher Pooley, rock musician and musical director
Jean (Racine) Prahm, U.S. Olympian bobsledder
Brett Reed, men's basketball head coach, Lehigh University
Trevor Strnad, lead singer, The Black Dahlia Murder
James "Jamie" Hembree, lead singer, guitarist, writer  Solo Artist

References

Sources

External links

 Charter Township of Waterford Michigan
 Waterford Township Public Library
 Waterford Area Chamber of Commerce

 
Townships in Oakland County, Michigan
Charter townships in Michigan
Metro Detroit
1834 establishments in Michigan Territory
Populated places established in 1834
Former census-designated places in Michigan